Karl Heiland (1876 – 1932) was a German screenwriter, film producer and director of the silent era.

Selected filmography 
 The Spy (1917)
 Treasure of the Aztecs (1921)
 The White Geisha (1926)

References

Bibliography 
 John T. Soister. Conrad Veidt on Screen: A Comprehensive Illustrated Filmography. McFarland, 2002.

External links 
 

Film people from Düsseldorf
1876 births
1932 deaths
Film people from North Rhine-Westphalia
German screenwriters
German film producers
German film directors
Silent film directors
Silent film producers
Silent film screenwriters